{{DISPLAYTITLE:C21H27ClO3}}
The molecular formula C21H27ClO3 (molar mass: 362.89028 g/mol, exact mass: 362.1649 u) may refer to:

 Chlormadinone
 Cismadinone, also known as 6α-chloro-17α-hydroxypregna-1,4-diene-3,20-dione

Molecular formulas